Kaiya Ruiter (born 30 May 2006) is a Canadian figure skater. She is the 2022 CS Ice Challenge silver medallist and 2023 Canadian national silver medallist. 

Ruiter is also the 2021 JGP France I silver medallist, the 2021 JGP France II bronze medallist, and the 2020 Canadian junior national champion.

Personal life 
Ruiter was born on 30 May 2006 in Ottawa, Ontario, to parents Kris and Victoria. She is the second of four children. Her three sisters – Keaghan, Vaunya, and Vyan – have all competed in figure skating. Ruiter attends school through a homeschooling program.

Career

Early years 
Ruiter began learning to skate with her parents and sisters at age four on the Rideau Canal in Ottawa. She officially began training at age six at the Gloucester Skating Club under Darlene Joseph.

Ruiter's family relocated from Ottawa to Edmonton in 2016 when Ruiter was 10, and there she began training under Ravi Walia, coach of the 2018 Olympic bronze medalist Kaetlyn Osmond. However, ten months later, the family moved again, this time to Calgary, and Ruiter began working with her current coaches, Jeff Langdon and Scott Davis, per Walia's recommendation. Ruiter landed her first triple jump, a triple toe loop, in November 2018 and went on to learn the rest of her triple jumps and triple-triple combinations within a year.

In January 2019, Ruiter won the 2019 Canadian novice national title, setting a new national record for the novice women's event with a score of 139.57 (later broken by Amy Shao Ning Yang in 2020). The following month, she competed at her first international assignment, the 2019 Bavarian Open, where she placed third in the novice women's category behind Kimmy Repond of Switzerland, and Lindsay Thorngren from the United States.

2019–20 season: International junior debut
As the reigning national novice champion, Ruiter was selected to appear twice on the Junior Grand Prix in the autumn of 2019, with her first assignment being the 2019 JGP Latvia in Riga. Making errors in both programs, she finished eleventh overall but called it "a great experience," adding that "I just loved to skate out there and enjoyed every moment even though I didn't have my best skate." She made a significant improvement at her second event, the 2019 JGP Italy in Egna, where she finished sixth. Her score of 159.07 points was a junior record for a Canadian woman.

Following her international outings, Ruiter competed at and won the junior event at the 2020 Skate Canada Challenge, the final qualifying event for the 2020 Canadian Junior Championships. She took the gold medal with a total score of 174.83 points, bettering her own national junior record and winning by a margin of 31.52 points over silver medallist Emily Millard. By the time of the championships, Ruiter was attracting significant media attention due to both her technical content and the comparatively weak women's field at the senior event that occurred. She was the only competitor at either the senior or junior levels to successfully perform a triple Lutz-triple toe loop combination and one of only a few to even attempt it. Her score was slightly short of senior national champion Emily Bausback's winning score of 175.54 but would have surpassed with the additional senior choreographic sequence included.

Ruiter was given additional international assignments for the remainder of the season, first winning gold in the junior event at the Bavarian Open. Her season had a disappointing finish at the 2020 World Junior Championships in Tallinn, where she fell twice in the short program and did not qualify for the free skate segment, coming in thirty-first.

2020–21 season: Pandemic
The onset of the COVID-19 pandemic significantly disrupted training and competitions for all skaters. With the international junior season and the Canadian domestic season largely cancelled, Ruiter's lone major competitive appearance came at a virtually-held 2021 Skate Canada Challenge. Competing in the senior women's category for the first time, she won the short program but dropped to fourth place following the free skate.

2021–22 season: JGP medals
With the resumption of international junior competition, Ruiter was again given two Junior Grand Prix assignments, this time to both editions of the French Junior Grand Prix, held in consecutive weeks in Courchevel. Notably, Russian skaters could not participate in these two events due to Russia's Sputnik V COVID-19 vaccine not meeting France's standards for adequate vaccination, significantly affecting the women's field given Russian dominance in that discipline in years prior. At the first event, Ruiter was third after the short program, behind Americans Clare Seo and Lindsay Thorngren, but overtook Seo in the free skate and won the silver medal. This was the first JGP medal for a Canadian woman since Gabrielle Daleman's bronze medal in 2013. The following weekend, Ruiter won the bronze medal, becoming the first Canadian woman multi-medallist on the Junior Grand Prix since 2008. She said she was "so proud" of the results.

Following the Junior Grand Prix, Ruiter had planned to compete at the senior level as well, aiming to qualify for the Canadian Olympic team for Beijing. However, she sustained a significant injury in training in November of 2021, falling and slicing her calf muscles with the blade of her own skate. She later developed scar tissue problems, and was unable to resume proper training for almost a year.

2022–23 season: International senior debut
In her return to international competition, Ruiter made her Challenger series debut at the 2022 CS Ice Challenge in Graz. Sixth after the short program, she rose to second via the free skate, winning the silver medal.

After finishing sixth at Skate Canada Challenge, Ruiter qualified to the 2023 Canadian Championships, her first appearance at the senior level. Sixth in the short program after a jumping error, she went on to win the free skate and rise to second overall. Ruiter called her silver medal result "absolutely incredible." Coach Scott Davis called it "a testament to her daily training," after all the difficulties of the preceding year. 

Ruiter was named as Canada's lone women's entry at the 2023 World Junior Championships. The World Junior Championships were held in Ruiter's hometown of Calgary, in the WinSport Arena at Canada Olympic Park, her primary training location. She called it "a dream come true to get to perform not only in front of the home crowd but this is my home rink." Eleventh in the short program, she moved up to tenth after the free skate, and said it was "really special to perform here in front of friends and family."

Programs

Competitive highlights 
CS: Challenger Series; JGP: Junior Grand Prix.

Detailed results

Senior results

Junior results

References

External links 
 

2006 births
Living people
Canadian female single skaters
Sportspeople from Ottawa
Canadian children
21st-century Canadian women